Tareq Abdesselem (born 19, February) is an Olympic Head Coach and a former French Karateka champion. Tareq is the head national coach of team Olympic Kazakhstan for the 2021 Tokyo Olympics Games. He is also a former Thailand and Indonesia national head coach of the Karate team, and a former Athlete French national team. Under his coaching, the Kazakh karate team create a historical performance, by qualifying 5 athletes and winning two bronze medals at the 2020 Tokyo Olympics Games. The only team in the World to qualify complete Men Kumite Athletes in Tokyo.

Career 
Abdesselem was born in Marseille region, France on 19 February 1987. His first Karate match of event 32nd European Cadet & Junior Karate Championships happened in earlier 2005 in Greece. In 2013, The Thailand karate team under Abdesselem's coaching won the first-ever Southeast Asian Games (SEA) in the men's team event. And also, be among the Top 3 Asian Team at the 2015 Yokohama Asian Championships Seniors. The Indonesian team won 3 gold medals in the 2017 Southeast Asian Games (SEA) under Abdesselem's coaching. As an international athlete, Tareq Took medals at 3 World Karate1 Premier League and participated at Continental Championship, and World Championship, under the French National Team (FFK).

References 

Living people
French male karateka
21st-century French people
1987 births